Apollas or Apellas ( or ) was the author of a work On the Cities in the Peloponnese (Περὶ τῶν ἐν Πελοποννήσῳ πόλεων) about the Peloponnese peninsula, and On Delphi (Δελφικά). He appears to be the same as Apeilas, the geographer, of Cyrene mentioned in other manuscripts.

Notes

Ancient Greek geographers
Ancient Greek writers known only from secondary sources